James Edward Shaner (September 21, 1936 – April 15, 2012) was a Democratic member of the Pennsylvania House of Representatives.

He is a graduate of Uniontown Senior High School. He earned a bachelor's degree from Fairmont State College and a Master's degree from West Virginia University. He has also attended classes at California University of Pennsylvania.

He was first elected to represent the 52nd legislative district in 1994. Shaner underwent heart bypass surgery in October 2005. He announced his retirement in February 2006, citing health concerns. In 2007, it was revealed that Shaner, as a lame duck legislator, attended legislative training trips at the public's expense after his defeat. He died on April 15, 2012 in LaFayette Manor in Uniontown, Pennsylvania.

References

External links
 official PA House profile
 official Party website

1935 births
2012 deaths
Democratic Party members of the Pennsylvania House of Representatives
Fairmont State University alumni
West Virginia University alumni
People from Connellsville, Pennsylvania